Lujiang Station is a station on Line 8 of the Guangzhou Metro that started operation on 28June 2003. It is located under Xingang Road West and Xiadu Road in the Haizhu District of Guangzhou.

Before the extension to both lines 2 and 8 opened in September 2010, this station ran as part of Line 2 as a single line from Wanshengwei to Sanyuanli.

Station layout

Exits

References

Railway stations in China opened in 2003
Guangzhou Metro stations in Haizhu District